The Al Bu Shamis or Al Shawamis (singular Al Shamsi ) is an Arab Bedouin tribe that mostly inhabit the southeastern part of the Arabian peninsula. They are located mainly in Northern Oman, the United Arab Emirates, and to a lesser extent Kuwait, Qatar, eastern Saudi Arabia, Bahrain and Iraq. Due to the large nature of the tribe, there are today in fact many branches that trace themselves to the Al Bu Shamis tribe.

Origins 

The Na'im is divided into three sections, the Al Bu Kharaiban, the Khawatir, and the Al Bu Shamis. It is from the former section that the current Rulers of the emirate of Ajman are drawn. Of the three sections, the Al Bu Shamis has become virtually independent and associated closely with the Al Bu Falasa of Dubai.

Migration 

The Al bu Shamis emigrated from Western Arabia to settle around the Sunaynah area (an inland desert settlement in the Buraimi Wilayat of Oman ). Later migrations led some of them to Al Ain and Buraimi oases. Al Shamsi were also traditionally the heads of both Hamriyah and Al Heera, dependencies of Sharjah that frequently attempted to assert their independence through the 19th and into the 20th century.

The following families form branches of the Al Bu Shamis:
 Al-Moathen المؤذن
 Bin Omair بن عمير
 Al-Drawsha الدروشة
 Bin Rahma بن ارحمه
 Bin Hareb بن حارب
 Bin Taryam بن تريم
 Bin Almur بالمر
 Al-Jarwan الجروان
 Al-Owais العويس
 Al-Omran العمران
 Al-Dowais الدويس
 Al-Hamrani الحمراني
 Al-Nayeli النايلي

Notable members 
 Saeed Mohammed Al Shamsi – UAE Diplomat and Ambassador to Australia Saeed Mohammed Al Shamsi
 Hamad Rahma Al Shamsi – Owner of AlShamsi trading, a pioneer in the pearl and fabric industries.
 Abdulkareem Mohammed Al Amri Al Shamsi – UAE Diplomat, Former Ambassador to South Korea and Ex-President of Arab Authority of Agriculture and Development.
 Issa Khalfan Al Huraimel Al Shamsi – UAE Diplomat, Former UAE Ambassador to Saudi Arabia, Oman, Iran, Algeria, and Belgium
 Taryam Omran Taryam Al Shamsi – co-founder of Al Khaleej and Gulf Today newspapers
 Abdulaziz Nasser Al Shamsi – Protocol of the UAE Ministry of Foreign Affairs Abdulaziz Nasser Al Shamsi
 H.E. Maitha Salem Al-Shamsi, PhD – Minister of State and Head of the UAE Marriage Fund, Former Professor, Sociology, United Arab Emirates University, Former Deputy Vice Chancellor, Scientific Research, UAE University 
 H.E. Ali Al Shamsi– Assistant Secretary-General of the Supreme National Security Council and Chair of the Board of the General Authority for the Security of Ports, Borders and Free Zones.
 Ahmed Taryam Al Shamsi – former Deputy Minister of Labour.

See also 
 Al Nuaim
 Ali Mohammed Balmur Al Shamsi

References 

 Arabian Peninsula YDNA Project
 Bait Al Naboodah Guide Book 
 Abu Dhabi - Profile - Al Shamsi, APS Review Gas Market Trends, November 27, 1995.

Tribes of the United Arab Emirates
Tribes of Saudi Arabia
Arab groups
Tribes of Arabia